The 19th Army (German: 19. Armee) was a World War II field army of the German Army.

History 
Formed in August 1943 in occupied southern France from Armeegruppe Felber (the LXXXIII. Armeekorps), the 19th Army defended southern France, the Vosges Mountains, Alsace, Baden and southern Württemberg during the Allied invasion of southern France and other large Allied military operations that had as their goal the liberation of southern France and the invasion of southern Germany.  Although nominally a field army, the 19th Army was under strength and consisted of third tier soldiers, wounded veterans, conscripts and Hiwis.  Southern France in general was treated as a third tier theatre and given minimal attention by the OKW.  The entire army was outfitted with damaged and obsolete equipment, with four of the 19th army's divisions designated "static divisions," meaning that they were stripped of all mobile assets and forbidden to move from their assigned positions.  The Hiwis in particular proved unreliable and typically deserted or surrendered at the first opportunity.  The only asset that posed any threat to Allied plans was the 11th Panzer Division, and even then it had  2 of its five tank battalions reassigned to other formations deemed more critical to the war effort.

During Operation Dragoon, the 19th Army was trapped in an enormous encirclement, suffering 7,000 killed or missing, 20,000 wounded, 130,000-140,000 captured and was largely destroyed as a fighting force.  However, its headquarters survived intact, retreated northwards and participated in the defense of the Rhine River.

After the debacle in Southern France, the 19th Army was recreated with poorly trained conscripts and tasked with defending the west bank of the Rhine, and the city of Strasbourg.  The 19th Army was again encircled and largely destroyed during the battle for the Colmar Pocket in January and February 1945.  Once again its headquarters survived capture and was rebuilt largely from Volkssturm and hastily trained replacement troops in early 1945. With many of its best men and junior leaders dead or captured, the 19th Army's effectiveness was seriously impaired and it proved unable to parry the thrusts of its constant foe, the French First Army. Split by deep French armored thrusts into Baden, the Black Forest, and Württemberg, the 19th Army was destroyed in the area of Stuttgart and Münsingen in late April 1945, with remnants of the army surrendering as late as 8 May 1945. Formal surrender was accepted by Maj. General Edward H. Brooks, Commander of the U.S. Army's VI Corps.

Commanders

See also 
19th Army (German Empire) for the equivalent formation in World War I

Further reading 
 Tessin, Georg, (1976). Verbände und Truppen der deutschen Wehrmacht und Waffen-SS im Zweiten Weltkrieg 1939-1945 (Volume IV), Biblio Verlag, Osnabrück.  .

19
Military units and formations established in 1943
Military units and formations disestablished in 1945